The 2002 WGC-NEC Invitational was a professional golf tournament, held August 22–25 at Sahalee Country Club in Sammamish, Washington. It was the fourth WGC-NEC Invitational tournament, and the second of four World Golf Championships events held in 2002. It was the only time the event was not held at Firestone Country Club in Akron, Ohio. Sahalee hosted the PGA Championship four years earlier in 1998.

Craig Parry won the tournament, four strokes ahead of runners-up Robert Allenby and Fred Funk, for his first victory on the PGA Tour. It was Parry's only win in a World Golf Championship event, and the first WGC-NEC Invitational which Tiger Woods did not win; his winning streak was stopped at three as he finished in fourth, five strokes back. Rich Beem, winner of the PGA Championship the previous week, finished in a tie for sixth.

With the win, Parry moved to 45th in the Official World Golf Ranking, up 73 spots from the previous week.

Field
1. 2002 United States and European Ryder Cup teams
United States: Paul Azinger (2,3), Mark Calcavecchia (3), Stewart Cink (2,3), David Duval (2,3,4), Jim Furyk (2,3,4), Scott Hoch (3), Davis Love III (2,3), Phil Mickelson (2,3,4), Hal Sutton (2), David Toms (3,4), Scott Verplank (3,4), Tiger Woods (2,3,4)
Europe: Thomas Bjørn (3), Darren Clarke (3), Niclas Fasth (3), Pierre Fulke, Sergio García (3,4), Pádraig Harrington (3,4), Bernhard Langer (3, 4), Paul McGinley, Colin Montgomerie (3), Jesper Parnevik (3), Phillip Price, Lee Westwood

2. 2000 United States and International Presidents Cup teams
United States: Notah Begay III, Tom Lehman (3), Loren Roberts, Kirk Triplett
International: Robert Allenby (3,4), Stuart Appleby (3,5), Michael Campbell (3,4), Steve Elkington, Ernie Els (3,4), Carlos Franco, Retief Goosen (3,4), Shigeki Maruyama (3,4), Greg Norman, Nick Price (3,4), Vijay Singh (3,4), Mike Weir (3, 4)

3. Top 50 from the Official World Golf Ranking as of August 19
Rich Beem (4), Ángel Cabrera (4), José Cóceres (4), John Cook (4), Chris DiMarco (4), Bob Estes (4), Brad Faxon, Fred Funk, Toshimitsu Izawa, Jerry Kelly (4), Justin Leonard (4), Peter Lonard, Steve Lowery, Len Mattiace (4), Scott McCarron, Rocco Mediate (4), José María Olazábal (4), Kenny Perry, Eduardo Romero (4), Justin Rose (4), Kevin Sutherland (4)

4. Tournament winners of worldwide events since the 2001 WGC-NEC Invitational with an OWGR Strength of Field Rating of 100 points or more
K. J. Choi, John Daly, Tobias Dier, Joel Edwards, Matt Gogel, Ricardo González, Anders Hansen, Søren Hansen, Matt Kuchar, Paul Lawrie, Graeme McDowell, Craig Parry, Craig Perks, Chris Smith

5. The winner of selected tournaments from each of the following tours
Japan Golf Tour: Japan Golf Tour Championship (2002) – Nobuhito Sato
PGA Tour of Australasia: Australian Open (2001) – Stuart Appleby, qualified in categories 2 and 3
Sunshine Tour: The Tour Championship (2002) – Nicholas Lawrence
Asian Tour: Volvo China Open (2001) – Charlie Wi

Round summaries

First round
Thursday, August 22, 2002

Second round
Friday, August 23, 2002

Third round
Saturday, August 24, 2002

Final round
Sunday, August 25, 2002

Source:

References

External links
Coverage on the European Tour's official site

WGC Invitational
Golf in Washington (state)
Sammamish, Washington
WGC-NEC Invitational
WGC-NEC Invitational
WGC-NEC Invitational
WGC-NEC Invitational